Tunkás Municipality (In the Yucatec Maya language: “bad or ugly stone”) is one of the 106 municipalities in the Mexican state of Yucatán containing   of land and located roughly  east of the city of Mérida.

The municipality relies on farming for the majority of its economy, along with remittances from emigrants. Tunakseños migrate to the beach resorts of Quintana Roo, mostly Cancún and Playa del Carmen, as well as to the United States. Large concentrations of people from Tunkás can be found in Inglewood and Anaheim, both in California.

History
In ancient history, the area belonged to the chieftainship of Cupul until the conquest. At colonization, Tunkás became part of the encomienda system and the encomenderos listed in 1735 were Diego Ramón del Castillo y Juan and Baltazar de la Cámara. In 1821, Yucatán was declared independent of the Spanish Crown. In 1825 the area was part of the Valladolid region.

Governance
The municipal president is elected for a term of three years. The president appoints four Councilpersons to serve on the board for three year terms, as the Secretary and councilors of public services, public security, and ecology.

Communities
The head of the municipality is Tunkás, Yucatán. There are 15 inhabited communities in the municipality: Canasultun, Ebulá, Franz, Kancabal, Kancabchen, Onichén, San Antonio Chuc, San Dimas, San José Pibtuch, San Román, Tabichén, Tunkás, Xcauil, Yaxhá, and Yohuas. The major population areas are shown below:

Local festivals
Every year from 20 to 24 December the area celebrates a festival for St. Thomas the Apostle, patron of the town. From 30 January to 2 February, an annual fair is held which attracts people from other areas of the region.

Tourist attractions
 Templo de Tunkás, the colonial-era church
 Municipal Palace
 Cenote Chan
 Cenote Chan Lukun X’azul
 Cenote Mumundzonot
 Cenote X’tekdzonot

References

Municipalities of Yucatán